Baurelys Torres (born 20 September 1994) is a Cuban karateka. She won one of the bronze medals in the women's kumite 55 kg event at the 2019 Pan American Games held in Lima, Peru.

In 2018, she won the silver medal in the women's kumite 55 kg event at the Central American and Caribbean Games held in Barranquilla, Colombia.

Achievements

References 

Living people
1994 births
Place of birth missing (living people)
Cuban karateka
Pan American Games medalists in karate
Pan American Games bronze medalists for Cuba
Medalists at the 2019 Pan American Games
Karateka at the 2019 Pan American Games
Competitors at the 2018 Central American and Caribbean Games
Central American and Caribbean Games silver medalists for Cuba
Central American and Caribbean Games medalists in karate
20th-century Cuban women
21st-century Cuban women